The Rolls-Royce Phantom is a full-sized luxury saloon manufactured by Rolls-Royce Motor Cars. It is the eighth and current generation of the Rolls-Royce Phantom, debuting in 2017, and the second launched by Rolls-Royce under BMW ownership. It is offered in two wheelbase lengths. This is the current flagship model made by Rolls-Royce Motor Cars.

Launch 

The Phantom was unveiled by livestream on 27 July 2017.

It made its public debut at a special exhibition Rolls-Royce held in London two days later on 29 July. The event, dubbed "The Great Eight Phantoms", took place at Bonhams auction house in Mayfair. The exhibition gathered a noteworthy Phantom from each generation, from Fred Astaire's Phantom I to subsequent models driven by royalty, or made famous by celebrities, including John Lennon's Romany gypsy wagon-style painted Phantom V.

Design
The Phantom VIII's styling has been described as an evolution of the Phantom VII's as it bears most of the design features of its predecessor.

Like its predecessor, the Phantom VIII has a short front overhang and upright front end, a long bonnet and set-back passenger compartment as well as a long wheelbase and a flowing rear end. It also uses rear-opening "coach doors". For the first time on a Phantom, Rolls-Royce's trademark "Parthenon" radiator grille is integrated into the surrounding bodywork.

The Phantom is available in two wheelbase lengths.

Phantom Extended Wheelbase

The Rolls-Royce Phantom Extended Wheelbase (EWB), or the Phantom Extended, is a special variant of the Rolls-Royce Phantom which is  longer than the standard model.

The car's exterior design is identical to the original Phantom and excluding the length, every feature has been adapted from the standard model.

The car's rear passenger compartment has been enlarged and the interior features the iconic "Starlight Headliner" which uses more than 1500 fibre optics to create an impression of a night sky with stars. This was first applied on the Phantom Celestial.

The interior also features a partition between the front cockpit and the rear passenger compartment and the rear passenger compartment has been made soundproof for privacy which is known as the "Privacy Suite" by the Rolls-Royce Motor Cars.

It is also allowed for the buyers to customize the car's interior for some extent (the "Gallery" feature lets the users customize the dashboard and other minor features).

While the original Phantom VIII costs US$450,000 upwards the Phantom Extended Wheel Base costs US$535,000 upwards making it the most expensive luxury sedan made by Rolls-Royce.

Phantom Series II
In May 2022, Rolls-Royce announced the Series II car, to be available from the 2023 model year. Series II has a number of updated and improved features, including:
 new garnish above the Pantheon Grille and above the LED Daytime Running Lamps
 headlamps have been revised come with bezel starlights
 a new set of disc wheels

Specifications

Platform
The Phantom uses an aluminium spaceframe chassis; this is a version of Rolls-Royce's modular "Architecture of Luxury" platform. The Phantom is the first car to be based on this new platform, which is also used by the Cullinan SUV and will be used by other future Rolls-Royce models.

Suspension and steering
The Phantom is fitted with self-levelling air springs and electronically controlled dampers front and rear. It uses a double wishbone front axle and a 5-link rear axle. It is also equipped with active anti-roll bars.

The suspension system is linked to a stereo camera mounted behind the windscreen. This scans the road ahead and preconfigures the spring and damper rates, and the anti-roll bars, so as to improve ride quality.

The Phantom is the first Rolls-Royce to be fitted with four-wheel steering. Between  the rear wheels do not steer at all. At speeds above 80 km/h the rear wheels turn in the same direction as the front wheels through a maximum of 1° to increase high-speed stability.

The Phantom uses "Silent-Seal" tyres which Rolls-Royce co-developed with Continental. These use a layer of foam inside the tyre to reduce tyre cavity noise, lowering sound levels in the cabin by up to 9 decibels.

Interior

The interior is fully bespoke and personalised to the clientele like previous and current Rolls-Royce models offer. It has the BMW iDrive infotainment system with 3D camera view. They also have "The Gallery", a display section in the vehicle in the front seat veneer with experimentation of different materials and artwork to be integrated with the vehicle and all the options are limitless.

Powertrain

The Phantom is exclusively available with a twin-turbocharged 6.75-litre V12 engine. This is a variant of BMW's N74 called the N74B68 which is unique to the Phantom.

ZF's 8HP 8-speed automatic transmission is the sole gearbox option. This is linked to a GPS receiver which analyses the car's location and speed to optimise shift timing.

Equipment 
The Electronic Architecture of the New Phantom is the largest ever component produced by the BMW Group that let alone Rolls-Royce. Some, but not all, assistance systems on-board New Phantom include:

 Night vision
4-camera system with Panoramic View
Alertness-assistant
 Adaptive cruise control
 7x3 HD Head-up display
 WiFi hotspot
 Laser headlights with high-beam range of more than 600 metres

Special editions by tuners

Phantom VIII Black Bison

The Phantom VIII Black Bison is a version of the Phantom modified by automotive tuning company WALD international based on the standard Rolls-Royce Phantom VII.

The car's exterior design features a new lower bodywork system, a new exhaust system, a new set of 24 inch wheels known as the "I13- F Forged Wheel Set" and matte black colour paint. The car has been in production from the end of 2018.

Reception 
The Phantom has been very well received by automotive journalists, with many outlets considering it to be the best luxury car on sale.

The Phantom's refinement came in for particularly high praise, with Matt Prior in Autocar labelling it "utterly exceptional" and Mike Duff in Car and Driver describing it as "freakishly quiet".

Ride quality was adjudged to be similarly good; Gavin Green in Car remarked that the Phantom's ride comfort is "a cut above anything on the road" and Angus MacKenzie in Motor Trend said "the ride is truly magical".

The Phantom's interior also came in for praise: it was variously described as "utterly exemplary", "wonderful" and "spectacular".

In light of its weight and size, magazines considered the Phantom's driving dynamics to be impressive: reviewers praised the car's surprising dynamism and agility, light and precise steering,
and excellent brake pedal feel.

The Phantom was named Top Gear's 2017 "Luxury Car of the Year".

It has received the UK Car of the Year Awards’ prestigious ‘Best Luxury Car’ honour. Drawing on votes from a jury of 27 leading motoring journalists, the awards highlight the best new cars on the market for UK customers.

Autocar gave the 2018 Phantom a "Five Star Car" award at the 2018 Autocar Awards.

Production and sales 
The Phantom is assembled by hand at Rolls-Royce's plant in Goodwood, West Sussex, England.

Customer deliveries commenced in January 2018.

According to own Statement of BMW AG, Rolls-Royce and similar institutions, this generation of automobile with combustion engine has a preview to an end until 2030, due the company only producing electric models.

References

External links

 Official webpage
 Rolls-Royce Motor Cars PressClub
 "Great Phantoms" microsite

Full-size vehicles
Luxury vehicles
Flagship vehicles
Limousines
Rear-wheel-drive vehicles
Rolls-Royce Phantom VIII
Sedans
Cars introduced in 2017